Christoph Schösswendter (born 15 July 1988) is an Austrian footballer who plays as a defender for Blau-Weiß Linz.

Career
In January 2019, Schösswendter agreed the termination of his contract with 1. FC Union Berlin. On 12 January, he then signed with Admira Wacker again, on a contract until June 2021.

On 19 October 2020, he signed with Austria Wien.

On 22 January 2022, Schösswendter signed a 1.5-year contract with Blau-Weiß Linz.

Club statistics

References

External links

1988 births
Living people
People from Zell am See
Austrian footballers
Association football defenders
SK Rapid Wien players
FC Lustenau players
SC Rheindorf Altach players
FC Admira Wacker Mödling players
Austrian Football Bundesliga players
2. Liga (Austria) players
2. Bundesliga players
Austrian Regionalliga players
1. FC Union Berlin players
FK Austria Wien players
FC Blau-Weiß Linz players
Austrian expatriate footballers
Austrian expatriate sportspeople in Germany
Footballers from Salzburg (state)